Churchill Park is a 40-hectare park in the Auckland suburb of Glendowie, in New Zealand. It was named after Winston Churchill upon the park's creation in 1945, and lies on the eastern side of the Auckland isthmus towards the Tamaki River. Glendowie suburb was established in the 1920s when George Riddell created a loop road in the area. The owner of the rural blocks of land in the centre of the loop combined them to form a golf course, which later became Churchill Park.

Churchill Park School, located at the northern end of the park, undertook a wetlands planting project in conjunction with the Auckland City Council in 2009 to improve Churchill Park.

References

External links
 Churchill Park Auckland City Council
 Photographs of Churchill Park held in Auckland Libraries' heritage collections.

Parks in Auckland